Evelyn Lip (aka Lip Mong Har) (born 1938) is a Malaysian-born architecture scholar and Feng shui consultant. She is the author and co-author of over fifty books on architecture, Chinese geomancy, and children's stories.

Born in Malaysia, she earned a Ph.D. in Architecture from the National University of Singapore (NUS)'s School of Architecture. She has lectured there for almost three decades, and is the former head of the School. She specializes in Chinese architecture and applies geomancy to her practice.

In October 1989, she was part of the six hand-picked delegates that traveled to the U.S. to market Singapore's art, culture, and conservation in order to change the perceptions that some people have about Singapore.

Works 

 Co-Author: Meetings with Remarkable Women (2012) Quicksilver Books. ASIN B007YCEXZA 
Author: Feng Shui for Harmony in the Home (2010) Cavendish Square Publishing. 
 Author: Your Face is Your Fortune (2010) Cavendish Square Publishing. 
 Author: All You Need to Know about Feng Shui (2009) Cavendish Square Publishing.  
Author: Feng Shui for Success in Business (2009) Cavendish Square Publishing. 
Author: Feng Shui in Chinese Architecture (2009) Cavendish Square Publishing. 
Author: Personalise your Feng Shui and Transform your Life (2009) Cavendish Square Publishing.  
Author: Chinese Practices and Beliefs (2001) Heian International.  
Author: Design and Feng Shui of Logos, Trademarks and Signboards (1998) Stone Bridge Press. 
 Author: Personalize your Feng Shui: A Step by Step Guide to the Pillars of Destiny (1997) Heian International. 
Author: 1000 Character Classic (1997) Raffles Editions. 
Author: Feng Shui for Business (1995) Times Editions.  
Author: Feng Shui: Environments of Power - A Study of Chinese Architecture (1995) Wiley. 
 Author: Fun with Astrology (1994) Graham Brash. 
Author: Out of China (1993) Addison-Wesley. 
 Author: Chinese Geomancy (1992) Times Books International. 
 Author: Chinese Numbers (1992) Heian International. 
 Author: Feng Shui for the Home (1990) Heian International.  
 Author: Feng Shui for the Business (1989) Stone Bridge Press. 
 Author: Choosing Auspicious Chinese Names (1988) Stone Bridge Press. 
Author: Feng Shui: A Layman's Guide to Chinese Geomancy (1987) Times Books International. 
 Author: Notes on Things Chinese (1986) Federal Publications.  
 Author: Chinese Beliefs and Superstitions (1985) Graham Brash. 
Author: Chinese Proverbs and Sayings (1984) Graham Brash. 
 Author: Chinese Temples and Deities (1981) Times Books International. 
Author: The Fairy Princess (1981) Macmillan Education Ltd.

References 

1938 births
Living people